The 2nd Nebraska Cavalry Regiment was a cavalry regiment that served in the Union Army during the American Civil War.

Service
The 2nd Nebraska Cavalry Regiment was initially organized at Omaha, Nebraska, on October 23, 1862, as a nine-month regiment, and served for over one year. They were attached to General Sully's command, who was in a campaign against Indians in Western Nebraska and Dakota, who were forced to move south from Minnesota following the Dakota War of 1862.

Battle of Whitestone Hill
The 2nd Nebraska participated in the Battle of Whitestone Hill, which began on September 3, 1863, when General Sully's troops engaged upwards of 2,000 warriors under Chief Two Bears of the Yanktonai Sioux. Of the 20 US troopers killed in the battle, seven were from the Second Nebraska. Fourteen from the unit were also wounded in the action.

The regiment was mustered out December 23, 1863. A number of its veterans were re-enlisted in the 1st Nebraska Veteran Cavalry Battalion, which served until 1865 when it was merged with the 1st Nebraska Cavalry Regiment.

Total strength and casualties
1,384 men were enlisted in the regiment

Commanders
Colonel Robert Wilkinson Furnas

See also
List of Nebraska Civil War Units
Nebraska in the American Civil War

Notes

References
 
The Civil War Archive

Units and formations of the Union Army from Nebraska Territory
1862 establishments in Nebraska Territory
Military units and formations established in 1862
Military units and formations disestablished in 1863